Lora Hristova (born 23 April 2003) is a Bulgarian biathlete. She competed at the 2022 Winter Olympics, in Women's sprint, and Women's relay. She competed at the 2020 Winter Youth Olympics.

References 

2003 births
Living people
Bulgarian female biathletes
Olympic biathletes of Bulgaria
Biathletes at the 2022 Winter Olympics
Place of birth missing (living people)
Biathletes at the 2020 Winter Youth Olympics
21st-century Bulgarian women